Negalora: Íntimo (English: Negalora: Intimate) is the second live album by the Brazilian recording artist Claudia Leitte, released on August 29, 2012. The album was recorded during a benefit concert performed on December 13, 2011, at "Teatro Castro Alves" in Salvador, Bahia. The title refers to a nickname given to Leitte by frequent collaborator and Academy Award nominated musician Carlinhos Brown in 2005.

Track listing 
On August 13, 2012, the store "Saraiva" revealed the track list of the CD and DVD with the pre-sale.

CD

DVD

Awards

Commercial performance 
The album debuted at number nine on Brasil Top 20 Semanal, with sales of 80,000, equivalent to Gold Record for CD and DVD. Until June 2013, the CD sold over 65,000 copies and the DVD has sold more than 80,000 copies, for a total of 145,000 physical copies of the album.

The CD peaked at number five  in Brazil, the DVD peaked at number three. In the iTunes Store, the album reached number one in Brazil.

Charts

Weekly charts

Year-end charts

Release history

References 

 

2012 live albums
Claudia Leitte albums